Richie "LaBamba" Rosenberg is an American trombonist originating from Philadelphia, Pennsylvania. He is a former member of the house band on Conan O'Brien's late-night talk shows.

Early life and education
Rosenberg became a trombonist when his junior high instrumental director, Leroy Evans, lent him a trombone to practice with over a summer break. Evans, concerned about a shrinking brass section due to graduating students, told Rosenberg to learn how to play and to come see him in the fall when school resumed. Rosenberg attributes "it all" to Evans. One memorable number performed by the Jazz Band under Mr. Evans was the immortal, "Take Back Your Heart, I ordered Liver!" 

Rosenberg attended George Washington High School on Bustleton Avenue in Northeast Philadelphia. His senior year in high school, he and the saxophonist in jazz band both made first chair in the Philadelphia All City Jazz band. Rosenberg's early influences included J. J. Johnson, Otis Redding, and Teddy Pendergrass.

Early career
After a short-lived first year at the Philadelphia Music Academy, Rosenberg abandoned his scholarship to tour with the band Vicki Allen and the Image. A high school friend and fellow musician Rick Gazda called him with "an offer [he couldn't] refuse" that brought him from Schenectady, New York to the Stone Pony rock club in Asbury Park, New Jersey. The offer came from Southside Johnny and the Asbury Jukes.

After joining the Jukes, Rosenberg moved to the Jersey Shore and lived in Belmar, Long Branch, and across from the Stone Pony.

In 1981, a Jukes show at The Savoy, now the Hudson Theatre in New York City, caught the attention of Diana Ross's producer Nile Rodgers, who asked the horn section (known as The Miami Horns) to go on the road with her. After a two-year tour with Ross, Rosenberg returned, only to hit the road with Little Steven's world tour in support of his album Men Without Women.

In the mid-1980s, Rosenberg fine-tuned his own bands, LaBamba and the Hubcaps and LaBamba's Big Band, made up of 13 horns.

Rosenberg related how he acquired his nickname in an interview by Patrick Jones:

Association with Conan O'Brien
While touring in Europe with Southside Johnny in 1993, Rosenberg got a phone call from Bruce Springsteen and the E Street Band drummer Max Weinberg, who had been tapped as the bandleader for Late Night with Conan O'Brien. Rosenberg joined fellow Miami Horns trumpeter Mark Pender on the show's band, The Max Weinberg 7. The band moved over with O'Brien to The Tonight Show in 2009 and became Max Weinberg and The Tonight Show Band. When Conan left as a result of the 2010 Tonight Show conflict, the band followed him again, this time to TBS, for O'Brien's new television show Conan where they were known as Jimmy Vivino and the Basic Cable Band.

In addition to playing the trombone, he also performed in skits such as "In the Year 2000." He was also commonly the butt of Conan O'Brien's jokes during his monologues or interviews in which Rosenberg was often implied to be some variety of sexual deviant. Rosenberg responded with chagrin, or a few times, hid his face behind a sheet of music. He also occasionally acted in comedy bits, during or after which O'Brien nearly always ridiculed Rosenberg's meager line reading and acting skills.

In January 2019, O'Brien premiered the new format for Conan which removed the band, ending their nearly quarter century television relationship.

Notable performances
In 1990, Rosenberg was joined by Ed Manion (baritone sax), Mario Cruz (tenor sax), and Al Chez (trumpet), billed as The Miami Horns, as part of Dave Edmunds All-Star Rock and Roll Revue. The Revue featured Edmunds with Graham Parker, Kim Wilson, and Dion leading the band which also included legendary guitarist Steve Cropper.

Rosenberg and Jon Bon Jovi joined forces for charity events including the Special Olympics' "Very Special Christmas" television special in 1999, hosted by President Bill Clinton and Hillary Clinton at the White House.

On May 3, 2007, Rosenberg performed the national anthem at the Golden State Warriors' playoff game (Game 6) vs. the Dallas Mavericks. With Conan being in San Francisco that week filming his show, LaBamba was invited to perform The Star-Spangled Banner at the Oracle Arena in Oakland, California.

He and his big band teamed up with Southside Johnny for the album Grapefruit Moon: The Songs of Tom Waits, released in September 2008. The first two sessions were recorded in Bon Jovi's garage.

In September 2008, Rosenberg brought his band, LaBamba's Big Band, on Late Night with Conan O'Brien to perform what Rosenberg later referred to as "the most outrageous experience ever, more so than the Super Bowl."

On February 1, 2009, Rosenberg performed with Springsteen and the E Street Band during the halftime show of Super Bowl XLIII despite suffering a recent foot injury. "There was so much adrenaline that I didn't feel any pain in my foot", he described afterwards.

Personal life
Rosenberg is married and has five children.

References

External links

Year of birth missing (living people)
Living people
People from Belmar, New Jersey
Musicians from Philadelphia
American trombonists
Male trombonists
The Max Weinberg 7 members
Southside Johnny & The Asbury Jukes members
Musicians from New Jersey
Jersey Shore musicians
Jewish American musicians
The Tonight Show Band members
Jimmy Vivino and the Basic Cable Band members
21st-century trombonists
The Miami Horns members
The Sessions Band members